Akaki Mikuchadze is a Georgian footballer.

Honours
Umaglesi Liga (1):
2005-06
Liga Leumit - Top Goalscorer (1):
2009-10 (18 goals)

References

External links

1980 births
Living people
Footballers from Georgia (country)
FC Dinamo Tbilisi players
FC Merani Tbilisi players
FC Tbilisi players
FC Kolkheti-1913 Poti players
FC Sioni Bolnisi players
Hapoel Be'er Sheva F.C. players
Hapoel Nof HaGalil F.C. players
FC Metalurgi Rustavi players
Maccabi Ironi Bat Yam F.C. players
Hapoel Bnei Lod F.C. players
Maccabi Be'er Sheva F.C. players
Liga Leumit players
Expatriate footballers in Israel
Expatriate sportspeople from Georgia (country) in Israel
Expatriate footballers from Georgia (country)
Association football forwards